Pura Taman Ayun is a compound of Balinese temple and garden with water features located in Mengwi subdistrict in Badung Regency, Bali, Indonesia. Henk Schulte Nordholt wrote in his book Negara Mengwi that Taman Ayun was renovated in 1750. The architect’s name is given as Hobin Ho. The temple garden was featured on the television program Around the World in 80 Gardens. On 2012, the Subak cultural landscape of Bali including Pura Taman Ayun was inscribed as a World Heritage Site by UNESCO.

Gallery

See also
Tan Hu Cin Jin

References

Pura Taman Ayun Temple Everything You Need to Know About Pura Taman Ayun Temple in Bali

Balinese temples
Hindu temples in Indonesia
Tourist attractions in Bali
Buildings and structures in Bali